Chapel Town F.C. is an English association football club based in Chapel-en-le-Frith, Derbyshire.

History
The club has competed in the FA Amateur Cup. The club won the Manchester Football League Division One in 2007–08 and 2013–14.

Honours
Manchester Football League Division One
Champions 2007–08, 2013–14

References

External links

Football clubs in England
Football clubs in Derbyshire
Manchester Football League
Hope Valley Amateur League
Chapel-en-le-Frith